Eddy Vorm (born 4 June 1989 in Nieuwegein, Netherlands) is a Dutch footballer who made his Eerste Divisie league debut for club RKC Waalwijk during the 2008-2009 season.

References

External links
voetbal international profile

1989 births
Living people
Dutch footballers
RKC Waalwijk players
Eredivisie players
Eerste Divisie players
People from Nieuwegein
Association football forwards
Dutch expatriate footballers
Expatriate footballers in Germany
1. FC Magdeburg players
Footballers from Utrecht (province)
Dutch expatriate sportspeople in Germany